Olávio Vieira dos Santos Júnior (born 21 November 1996), commonly known as Juninho, is a Brazilian footballer who plays for G.D. Chaves, as a forward.

Career statistics

References

External links

1996 births
Living people
Brazilian footballers
Brazilian expatriate footballers
Association football forwards
Campeonato Brasileiro Série A players
Campeonato Brasileiro Série B players
Campeonato Brasileiro Série C players
Liga Portugal 2 players
Club Athletico Paranaense players
Guaratinguetá Futebol players
Portimonense S.C. players
Grêmio Esportivo Brasil players
Grêmio Esportivo Novorizontino players
Figueirense FC players
Vila Nova Futebol Clube players
G.D. Estoril Praia players
G.D. Chaves players
Brazilian expatriate sportspeople in Portugal
Expatriate footballers in Portugal